The Gastonia Honey Hunters are a professional baseball team based in Gastonia, North Carolina. They play in the South Division of the Atlantic League of Professional Baseball, a "partner league" of Major League Baseball, at CaroMont Health Park in Gastonia, North Carolina.

History
In 2019 the Atlantic League announced it was considering a new franchise in Gastonia. Work officially began in November 2019, for the new ballpark in Gastonia. In July 2020, the league announced the addition of a new franchise in Gastonia beginning in 2021; it would be the league's second team based in North Carolina. Brandon Bellamy was announced as the team's owner.

On August 15, 2020, a "Name the Team" contest was launched. On October 8, 2020, the names were narrowed down to Fire Ants, Hogzillas, Honey Hunters, Hotshots, and Uppercuts.

On January 13, 2021, the Honey Hunters name, logo and colors were announced. "Honey Hunters" refers to the toughness of a honey badger (Mellivora capensis) and the ability to seek out positive things in hard times. The moniker also alludes to Ransom Hunter, the first freed slave to own property in Gaston County, of which Gastonia is the county seat.

The team's first game was an exhibition on May 23, 2021, followed by the regular season opening day game on May 25.

In 2022, manager Mauro Gozzo was named Atlantic League Manager of the Year. In the off-season he signed a three-year contract extension.

Season by season results

Current roster

References

External links

2020 establishments in North Carolina
Baseball teams established in 2020
Atlantic League of Professional Baseball teams
Professional baseball teams in North Carolina
Gastonia, North Carolina
Gastonia Honey Hunters